This is a list of seasons completed by the Brooklyn Nets professional basketball team. The Nets were founded as the New Jersey Americans in 1967, a charter franchise of the American Basketball Association (ABA). A year later, the club relocated to Long Island, New York, and were renamed as the New York Nets. There, behind the play of Hall of Famer Julius Erving, the team won its only two ABA championships: in 1974 and 1976. After the 1975–76 season, the ABA merged with the National Basketball Association (NBA), and the Nets were one of four franchises that joined the NBA. After their first season in the NBA, the team moved back to New Jersey and was renamed as the New Jersey Nets.

In the NBA, the Nets have experienced only one period of sustained success, from the 2001–02 season to the 2006–07 season, when led by Jason Kidd they played in the postseason every year and twice reached the NBA Finals, but lost to Shaquille O'Neal-led Los Angeles Lakers in 2002 and then to Tim Duncan-led San Antonio Spurs in 2003. After 35 seasons in New Jersey, owner Mikhail Prokhorov moved the team to the New York City borough of Brooklyn to become the Brooklyn Nets.

Seasons

All-time records
As of the end of the 2021–22 season

Notes

References

 
seasons